Estray, in common law, is any domestic animal found wandering at large or lost, particularly if the owner is unknown. In most cases, this implies domesticated animals rather than pets.

Under early English common law, estrays were forfeited to the king or lord of the manor; under modern statutes, provision is made for taking up stray animals and acquiring either title to them or a lien for the expenses incurred in keeping them. A person taking up an estray has a qualified ownership in it, which becomes absolute if the owner fails to claim the animal within the statutory time limit. Whether the animal escaped through the owner's negligence or through the wrongful act of a third person is immaterial. If the owner reclaims the estray, he is liable for reasonable costs of its upkeep. The use of an estray during the period of qualified ownership, other than for its own preservation or for the benefit of the owner, is not authorized. Some statutes limit the right to take up estrays to certain classes of persons, to certain seasons or places, or to animals requiring care.

When public officials, such as a county sheriff impound stray animals, they may sell them at auction to recover the costs of upkeep, with proceeds, if any, going into the public treasury.   In some places, an uncastrated male livestock animal running at large may be neutered at the owner's expense.

In the United States, it is common for there to be a required "Notice of Estray" sworn and filed in a local office. The process usually takes a prescribed time to permit the property owner to collect his property. Otherwise, the finder obtains title to the property.

See also
Abandoned pets
Feral
Maverick (animal)
Waif and stray
Rabies

References

Domesticated animals
Legal terminology